File exchange can refer to 
File eXchange Protocol, a protocol for remotely connecting two computers.
File exchange service sites for exchanging files that are too large for email attachments.